Hendra Adi Bayauw (born 23 March 1993) is an Indonesian professional footballer who plays as a winger for Liga 1 club Bali United.

International career 
In 2008, Bayauw represented the Indonesia U-16, in the 2008 AFC U-16 Championship. Hendra Bayauw receives and score his first senior international cap against Philippines on June 5, 2012.

Career statistics

Club

International
Indonesian's goal tally first.

Indonesian's goal tally first.

Honours

Club
Semen Padang U-21
 Indonesia Super League U-21: 2014
Semen Padang
Indonesian Community Shield: 2013

Individual
 Indonesia Super League Rookie of the Year: 2014

References

External links
 Hendra Bayauw at Soccerway
 

Indonesian footballers
1993 births
Living people
People from Tulehu
Sportspeople from Maluku (province)
Indonesia international footballers
Indonesia youth international footballers
Persemalra Maluku Tenggara players
Indonesian Premier Division players
Persija Jakarta (IPL) players
Indonesian Premier League players
Semen Padang F.C. players
Mitra Kukar players
Persikabo 1973 players
Bali United F.C. players
Liga 1 (Indonesia) players
Association football wingers
21st-century Indonesian people